Letterman may refer to:

 Letterman (sports), a classification of high school or college athlete in the United States

People
 David Letterman (born 1947), American television talk show host
 Late Night with David Letterman, talk show that aired on NBC from 1982 to 1993
 Late Show with David Letterman, talk show that aired on CBS from 1993 to 2015
 My Next Guest Needs No Introduction with David Letterman, talk show carried by Netflix from 2018 to present
 Live on Letterman
 The Letterman Foundation for Courtesy and Grooming, a private foundation owned by David Letterman
 Rahal Letterman Lanigan Racing, an auto racing team
 Jonathan Letterman (1824–1872), American surgeon known as the "Father of Battlefield Medicine" and brother of William Henry
 William Henry Letterman (1832–1881), co-founder of the Phi Kappa Psi fraternity and brother of Jonathan
 Russell Letterman (1933–1990)
 Rob Letterman (1970)

Places
 Letterman Digital Arts Center, the home of several Lucasfilm units, located on the site of the former Letterman Army Hospital
 Letterman Army Hospital, hospital operating from 1898 to 1995 on the Presidio of San Francisco, named after Jonathan Letterman
 Camp Letterman

Art & culture
 The Lettermen, musical group
 "Letterman", a 2017 song by American rapper Wiz Khalifa
 The protagonist superhero from The Adventures of Letterman, an animated segment on the children's show The Electric Company

See also
 Mail carrier